Angela Jones (born December 23, 1968) is an American actress.

Biography
Jones was born in Greensburg, Pennsylvania, and then raised in Jeannette, Pennsylvania, where she graduated in 1986. She is a graduate of Point Park College in Pittsburgh. 

While attending graduate school at the Oslo Conservatory of Performing Arts in Sarasota, Florida, Jones was cast in the short film Curdled (1991), directed by Reb Braddock. Quentin Tarantino was impressed with her performance and created the role of Esmeralda Villalobos for her in Pulp Fiction, inspired by her earlier role. Tarantino then executive produced a 1996 remake of Curdled, in which she also starred.

In rock musician Slash's 2007 biography Slash, it was mentioned that while recording the soundtrack for the film Curdled, the two had a brief relationship. Jones was the inspiration for Slash's song "Obsession Confession" that he wrote for the Curdled soundtrack, with Slash stating that he and his band were fascinated by her after seeing her in Pulp Fiction.

Selected filmography
Curdled (1991, short film) .... Gabriela Ponce
Strapped (1993) .... Woman at Clinic
Pulp Fiction (1994) .... Esmeralda Villalobos
Curdled (1996, executive producer Quentin Tarantino) .... Gabriela Ponce
Underworld (1996) .... Janette
Fatal Encounters (1997) .... Monica Wilder
Morella (1997) .... Dr.Patricia Morella / Sarah Lynden
Pariah (1998) .... Angela
Children of the Corn V: Fields of Terror (1998) .... Charlotte
Back to Even (1998) .... Kim
Man on the Moon (1999) .... Hooker
Family Secrets (2001) .... Mary Drake
House at the End of the Drive (2006) .... Felicia
Chillerama (2011) .... Train Passenger

References

External links

American film actresses
Actresses from Pennsylvania
People from Jeannette, Pennsylvania
Living people
Point Park University alumni
1968 births
20th-century American actresses
21st-century American actresses